James Robert Ballantyne  (1813–1864) was a Scottish Orientalist.
From 1832 to 1845 he was a master at the Scottish Naval and Military Academy in Edinburgh, teaching Persian Hindi and Arabic to prospective officers of the East India Company.
From 1845 he was superintendent of the Sanskrit College (Benares) in Varanasi (then known as Benares). He went to England in 1861 where he was elected librarian of the India Office.

Ballantyne published grammars of  Sanskrit,  Hindi (2nd edition, 1868), and Marathi, and published an edition of the Laghukaumudi of Varadarāja 1849-52 and the first part of the Mahabhashya of Patanjali in 1856, for the first time opening native Indian grammatical tradition to a wider European scholarly audience.

Works
 Hindustani Grammar and Exercises, 1838
 Mahratta Grammar, 1839
 Elements of Hindu and Braj-Bhaka Grammar, 1839
 Hindustani Selections, 1840
 Pocket Guide to Hindustani Conversation, 4th ed. 1841
Persian Calligraphy, 2 ed. 1842
 Practical Oriental Interpreter, 1843
 Catechism of Sanskrit Grammar, 2 ed. 1845
 A Synopsis of Science from the Stand-point of the Nyáya Philosophy, 1852
 Christianity Contrasted with Indian Philosophy, 1859
 First Lessons in Sanskrit Grammar', 3 ed. 1862

References

British Indologists
Sanskrit grammarians
1813 births
1864 deaths
British Sanskrit scholars
German Sanskrit scholars